Joseph Copestake (born 1859) was an English footballer who played for Stoke.

Career
Copestake played for Newcastle-Under-Lyme before joining Stoke in 1885. He played in both FA Cup matches in the 1885–86 season as Stoke lost to Crewe Alexandra in a replay. He left the club at the end of the season and joined Stoke Town.

Career statistics

References

English footballers
Stoke City F.C. players
1859 births
Year of death missing
Association football forwards